Chaipat S.P.B. Mahavidyalaya, also known as Chaipat College, established in 2007, is a college in Chaipat beside at Rani Rashmoni Road, a gram panchayat in Daspur II, in the Paschim Medinipur district. It offers undergraduate courses in arts. It is affiliated to  Vidyasagar University.

Departments

Arts

Bengali (Hons),
English (Hons),
Sanskrit (Hons),
History (Hons),
Sociology,
Political Science,
Education,
Philosophy.

See also

References

External links
Chaipat S.P.B. Mahavidyalaya
Vidyasagar University
University Grants Commission
National Assessment and Accreditation Council

 Universities and colleges in Paschim Medinipur district
 Colleges affiliated to Vidyasagar University
 Educational institutions established in 2007
2007 establishments in West Bengal